Trichopilia brasiliensis is a species of orchid endemic to the Brazil state of Goiás.

References 

brasiliensis
Endemic orchids of Brazil
Flora of Goiás
Plants described in 1906
Taxa named by Alfred Cogniaux